Aqkol, also known as Akkol', (Aqköl, اقكول; , Akkol') is a town in Aktobe Region, west Kazakhstan.

References

Aktobe Region
Cities and towns in Kazakhstan